Hemeroplanis parallela is a species of moth in the family Erebidae. It is found in North America.

The MONA or Hodges number for Hemeroplanis parallela is 8475.

References

Further reading

 
 
 

Boletobiinae
Articles created by Qbugbot
Moths described in 1907